Erythrina tahitensis is a tree in the family Fabaceae endemic to French Polynesia.

References

Sources

tahitensis
Flora of French Polynesia
Critically endangered plants
Taxonomy articles created by Polbot